Gaianus of Tyre was the consular governor of Phoenicia in 362. Pagan Hellene rhetorician Libanius' Epistulae with Gaianus lists his achievements after his graduation from the law school of Beirut.

As a rule, Roman governors were chosen from provinces other that the ones they were appointed to; Libanius' epistula 799 relates that the Emperor made an exception to that rule and allowed  Gaianus, a Tyrian, to rule over his home province of Phoenicia.

References

Bibliography

4th-century Romans
Roman governors of Syria